Shih-Jen Hwang (born 1960) is a Taiwanese-American biostatistician and epidemiologist. She is a staff scientist in the Laboratory for Cardiovascular Epidemiology and Genomics at the National Heart, Lung, and Blood Institute. She is an investigator on the Framingham Heart Study.

Hwang completed a B.S. in nursing at Kaohsiung Medical University and a M.P.H. in epidemiology at the National Taiwan University. She earned a M.H.S. and Ph.D. in epidemiology at Johns Hopkins Bloomberg School of Public Health. Her 1994 dissertation was titled, Study of oral clefts: search for genetic variability and gene-environment interaction.

Selected works

References 

Living people
Place of birth missing (living people)
21st-century Taiwanese scientists
21st-century American women scientists
Kaohsiung Medical University alumni
National Taiwan University alumni
Johns Hopkins Bloomberg School of Public Health alumni
National Institutes of Health people
American women statisticians
Taiwanese statisticians
American women epidemiologists
American epidemiologists
Taiwanese epidemiologists
Taiwanese emigrants to the United States
1960 births
Biostatisticians